The 1974 Japan Open Tennis Championships was a combined men's and women's tennis tournament played on hard courts and took place in Tokyo, Japan. The men's events were part of the 1974 Commercial Union Assurance Grand Prix while the women's tournament was a non-tour event. The tournament was held from 7 October through 13 October 1974. First-seeded John Newcombe won the men's singles title and the accompanying $15,000 first prize money and Maria Bueno won the women's singles event.

Finals

Men's singles
 John Newcombe defeated  Ken Rosewall 3–6, 6–2, 6–3

Women's singles
 Maria Bueno defeated  Katja Ebbinghaus 3–6, 6–4, 6–3

Doubles
Not completed due to rain.

References

External links
 Official website
  Association of Tennis Professionals (ATP) tournament profile
 International Tennis Federation (ITF) tournament details

Japan Open Tennis Championships
Japan Open Tennis Championships
Japan Open Tennis Championships
Japan Open (tennis)